18 teams participated in the 1990–91 Egyptian Premier League season as the previous season was cancelled so there was no relegation. The first team in the league was the champion, and qualified to the African Cup of Champions Clubs.
Ismaily managed to win the league for the 2nd time in the club's history.

League table

Title playoff

Top goalscorers

Team information

Clubs and locations

References

1990–91 in African association football leagues
0
Premier